Șendreni may refer to:

 Șendreni, a commune in Galați County, Romania
 Șendreni, a village in Frumușica Commune, Botoșani County, Romania
 Șendreni, a village in Victoria Commune, Iaşi County, Romania
 Șendreni, a village in Vărzărești Commune, Nisporeni District, Moldova
 Șendreni, the Romanian name for Dranytsia Commune, Novoselytsia Raion, Ukraine